Kemal Kurt (29 October 1947 in Çorlu, Turkey – 21 October 2002 in Berlin, Germany) was an author, translator and photographer.

Vita 
 1966–72 studies in Turkey and in United States
 since 1975 living in Berlin
 since 1977 artistic photography
 since 1981 first book publications
 1983 PhD at the TU Berlin
 since 1990 working as a freelance writer
 Reading tours throughout Germany and Poland, Luxembourg, Netherlands, Austria, Turkey, Switzerland, South Africa, USA

Kemal Kurt has written short stories, novels, poetry, essays, features, children's books, radio plays, TV-filmscripts for children and published photography.

The heart of his work was the writing and not least the telling for children, primarily in broadcasting, in particular for multiple ARD-channels simultaneously transferred "Ohrenbär"-series of the SFB.

For adults, he wrote poetry, essays, short stories and satirical novels. Attention is here Was ist die Mehrzahl von Heimat? (1995), a pointed reflection of his ambivalent relationship with a Turkish origin and the German way of life as well as his satirical novel Ja, sagt Molly (1998), in which he settles with the most brilliant of Literature.
For many years the books of Kemal Kurt are also part of the curriculum of several American universities.

That left behind photo archive of Kemal Kurt includes 20000 images. Still by himself as a traveling exhibition of photos and poems conceived, menschen.orte is thanks to his estate managers inner part of current presentations.

Awards/fellowships 
In 1999 he had a fellowship at the Villa Aurora (exile home of Lion Feuchtwanger) in Pacific Palisades, CA, in 2000 at the international writers' retreats Hawthornden Castle at Edinburgh and "Waves of Three Seas" at Rhodes, 2001 at Centrum for Arts & Creative Education in Port Townsend, WA. In 1991 and 2000 he had grants from the foundation Stiftung Preußische Seehandlung Berlin for children's fiction. "Wenn der Meddah kommt" was listed among the three best German children's books in the spring of 1996 by WDR, Radio Bremen and Saarländischer Rundfunk and "The five Fingers and the Moon" was chosen the Best Picture Book of the month December 1997 by the German Academy for Children's Books.

Work

Books

Poetry / Photos / Prose 
Der Chinese von Schöneberg. stories. Berlin 2000, 
menschen.orte. poetry & photos. 
Ja, sagt Molly. novel. Berlin 1998, 
Was ist die Mehrzahl von Heimat?. essay. Reinbek 1995, 
Beim nächsten Ton. poetry. Berlin 1988
Abuzer Güler. Gedichte. Berlin 1988
Scheingedichte / Şiirimsi. poems, German / Turkey. Berlin 1988
Bilder einer Kindheit. novel and photos. Berlin 1986
...weil wir Türken sind /...Türk olduğumuz için. photos and stories; German / Turkey. Berlin 1981

Children's Book 
Die Sonnentrinker. Berlin 2002, 
Die verpatzten Zaubersprüche. Gossau-Zürich 2002, 
English (Marianne Martens): Mixed-up Journey to Magic Mountain
Italian (Andrea Passannante): Il mago pasticcione
French (Michelle Nikly): Demi-tour de magie
Dutch (Christine Kliphuis): De muslukte toverspreuk
Yunus. Big Book for the knees. Berlin-München 2001
Danish: Det er mig
Luxembourgish: Dat sinn ech
Dutch: Dit ben ik
Eine echt verrückte Nacht. Berlin 2001, 
Korean:
Als das Kamel Bademeister war. Turkey Tales. Berlin 1998, 
Cora die Korsarin. Hamburg 1998, 
Die Kinder vom Mondhügel. Hamburg 1997, 
Die fünf Finger und der Mond. picture book. Gossau-Zürich 1997, 
English (Anthea Bell): The Five Fingers and the Moon
French (Géraldine Elscher): La lune et les cinq doigts
Greek:
Dutch (Toby Visser) Vijf vingermannetjes op de maan
Sieben Zimmer voller Wunder. Hamburg 1996, 
Dutch (Yvonne Kloosterman): Zeven kamers vol wonderen
Wenn der Meddah kommt. Turkey tales for children. Hamburg 1995,  and Stuttgart 1997,

Translations: German-Turkish 
Hans de Beer: Kleiner Eisbär wohin fährst du? to Küçük beyaz ayı nereye gidiyorsun?, picture book, Gossau-Zürich 1994
Hans de Beer: Kleiner Eisbär, hilf mir fliegen! to Küçük Beyaz Ayı, Yardım Et Uçayım!, Bilderbuch, Gossau-Zürich 1999
Hans de Beer: Kleiner Eisbär, kennst du den Weg? to Küçük Beyaz Ayı Yolu Biliyor Musun?, Bilderbuch, Gossau-Zürich 2001
Marcus Pfister: Der Regenbogenfisch to Gökkuşağı Balığı – picture books, Gossau-Zürich  1994
Marcus Pfister: Der Regenbogenfisch schließt Frieden to Gökkuşğı Balığı Barışıyor – picture books, Gossau-Zürich 1998
Marcus Pfister: Der Regenbogenfisch überwindet seine Angst to Gökkusağı Balığı Korkusunu Yeniyor – picture books, Gossau-Zürich 2000
Marcus Pfister: Regenbogenfisch, komm hilf mir! to Gökkusağı Balığı, Bana Yardım Et! – picture books, Gossau-Zürich 2000
Bahman Nirumand, Belge Yayınları:  Iran – hinter den Gittern verdorren Blumen, Rowohlt, Reinbek 1985  to İran – Soluyor Çiçekler Parmaklıklar Ardında, Istanbul 1988

Translations: Turkish-German 
Gülten Dayıoğlu: Sık Dişini to Beiß die Zähne zusammen, together with V. Augustin and E. Giere, Berlin 1981

TV-Screenplays 
 to the ZDF-series: Karfunkel – Stories with children of the whole world
Auf den Spuren von Lakatosch. (R: Alejandro Quintano) 1994
Can und Oleg. (R: Yasemin Akay) 1994
Heimliche Weihnacht. (R: Yasemin Akay), 1992
Öffnen Sie den Koffer, Herr Özyurt!. (R: Thomas Dräger), 1991

Broadcasting

Autobiographical, essays, stories, commentaries, live presentations 
Autorenporträt. Series Domino, HR, 2001
Aziz Nesin – Das schlaflose Gewissen der Türkei. Series Wortspiel, DeutschlandRadio 1995
Die Meinung beim Früh-Stück. commentaries à 3 min. SFB 1994–1998
Livevortrag eigener Gedichte mit dem Musiker Hasan Kuzu. Unterhaltung am Samstag, WDR 1992–1993
Ein Leben in Anatolien. SDR 1992
Die Crux mit der Sprache. Passagen, SFB 1992
Keine Vorkommnisse an der Grenzübergangsstelle / Faralya. stories. Literatur auf 1, RIAS 1988
Der Chinese von Schöneberg / Die Traumdeuterin. stories.  Radio 100, West-Berlin 1988
Ich kann Dir nicht mehr in die Augen schauen. story. WDR 1985

Stories for Children 
Als das Kamel Bademeister war. Domino, HR, 2000
Hakan und der kleine Bär. Ohrenbär, SFB 1998
Cora die Korsarin. Ohrenbär, SFB 1997
Die traumhaften Reisen von Paula Pumpernickel und Emily Erdbeer. Ohrenbär, SFB 1996
Das Mädchen, das Rätsel liebte. Panther und Co, DeutschlandRadio 1995
Reise zum Zauberberg. Lilipuz, WDR 1995
Mehr vom Mondhügel. Ohrenbär, SFB 1995
Ein Stadtbummel durch Istanbul. Panther und Co, DeutschlandRadio 1995
Keloglans Streiche. Ohrenbär, SFB 1993
Als das Kamel Ausrufer und der Floh Barbier war. Ohrenbär, SFB 1992
Fingergeschichten. Ohrenbär, SFB 1991
Eine Reise von A wie Aitmatow bis Z wie Zuckmayer. Passagen, SFB 1991
Zurück in Aytepe. Passagen, SFB 1990
Ein Haus mit sieben Zimmern. Ohrenbär, SFB 1990
Vom Mondhügel. Ohrenbär, SFB 1989

Others 
Ulrich Karger (Hrsg.): Briefe von Kemal Kurt (1947–2002) − mit Kommentaren, Nachrufen und Rezensionen. Paperback 2013,  (E-Book: EAN/)

Personal life
Kurt was of Turkish Bulgarian origin.

References

External links 
 
 Archive of Kemal Kurt
buechernachlese.de Reviews and tributes to Kemal Kurt from Ulrich Karger

1947 births
2002 deaths
People from Çorlu
German people of Turkish descent
German children's writers
German male writers
Turkish writers in German